Peter "Peavy" Wagner (born 22 December 1964) is a German heavy metal musician best known as the lead singer, bassist and main songwriter of Rage.

Biography 

Wagner was born in Herne, North Rhine-Westphalia, the second of four children. His parents, both passionate amateur musicians, tried to inspire their kids for music since childhood. Eventually, Wagner learned his first instrument, the classical guitar. He started to play on the electrical guitar a few years later and, inspired by Lemmy from Motörhead, finally switched to the electric bass in the early 1980s.

In 1983, Wagner founded together with the two guitar players Jochen Schroeder and Alf Meyerratken the heavy metal band Avenger. In 1986, the band's name was changed to Rage. Wagner is the only member of the band to have stayed in it throughout its history. He currently performs as the band's bassist and singer.

Wagner also participated in Mekong Delta's two first albums, appeared on Axel Rudi Pell's Black Moon Pyramid as a guest bass player, and participated in Markus Grosskopf's project Bassinvaders.

Discography

Rage 
Prayers of Steel (as Avenger) (1985)
Depraved to Black (as Avenger) (1985)
Reign of Fear (1986)
Execution Guaranteed (1987)
Perfect Man (1988)
Secrets in a Weird World (1989)
Reflections of a Shadow (1990)
Extended Power (EP) (1991)
Trapped! (1992)
Beyond the Wall (EP) (1992)
The Missing Link (1993)
The Video Link (1994)
Refuge (EP) (1994)
10 Years in Rage (1994)
Black in Mind (1995)
Lingua Mortis (1996)
End of All Days (1996)
Live from the Vault (1997)
XIII (1998)
In Vain: Rage in Acoustic (1998)
The Best from the Noise Years (1998)
Ghosts (1999)
Welcome to the Other Side (2001)
Best of – All G.U.N. Years (2001)
Metal Meets Classic Live (2001)
Unity (2002)
Soundchaser (2003)
From the Cradle to the Stage (2004)
Speak of the Dead (2006)
Full Moon in St. Petersburg (2007)
Carved in Stone (2008)
Gib dich nie auf / Never Give Up (2009)
Strings to a Web (2010)
21 (2012)
The Soundchaser Archives (2014)
The Devil Strikes Again (2016)
Seasons of the Black (2017)
Wings of Rage (2020)
Resurrection Day (2021)

Bassinvaders 
 Hellbassbeaters (2008)

Lingua Mortis Orchestra 
LMO (2013)

Guest appearances 
 Axel Rudi Pell – Black Moon Pyramid (1996) – bass on "Gettin' Dangerous"
 Onkel Tom Angelripper – Ein schöner Tag... (1996) – Vocals (Choirs)
 Mob Rules – Hollowed Be Thy Name (2002) – vocals on "How the Gypsy Was Born"
 Victor Smolski – Majesty & Passion (2004) – bass on "Concert for 2 Violins With Orchestra: Chapter 1"
 Destruction – Inventor of Evil (2005) – vocals on "The Alliance of Hellhoundz"
 Nuclear Blast All-Stars – Into the Light (2007) – bass and vocals on "Terrified"
 Destruction – The Curse of the Antichrist: Live in Agony (2009) – vocals on "The Alliance of Hellhoundz"
 The Arrow – Lady Nite (2009) – vocals on "Keeper of Souls"
 "The Flames still burns" – song on "Ballroom Hamburg — A Decade of Rock" compilation (2010)
 DarkSun – Memento Mori (2012) – vocals on "Broken Dreams"

References

External links

German heavy metal singers
German male singers
German heavy metal bass guitarists
Male bass guitarists
1964 births
Living people
People from Herne, North Rhine-Westphalia
English-language singers from Germany
Rage (German band) members
Mekong Delta (band) members
German male guitarists